Santiago 'Santi' Cuesta Díaz (born 11 August 1971 in Avilés, Asturias) is a Spanish retired footballer who played as a left-back and midfielder.

External links

1971 births
Living people
People from Avilés
Spanish footballers
Footballers from Asturias
Association football defenders
Association football midfielders
La Liga players
Segunda División players
Segunda División B players
Tercera División players
Real Valladolid Promesas players
Real Valladolid players
RCD Espanyol footballers
CD Toledo players
CD Castellón footballers
AD Ceuta footballers
CP Cacereño players
Spain youth international footballers
Spain under-21 international footballers
Spain under-23 international footballers